Christina A. Minicucci is a State Representative who represents the 14th Essex District in the Massachusetts House of Representatives. She represents the towns of Haverhill, Lawrence, Methuen,  and North Andover. Minicucci serves on the House Committee on Steering, Policy and Scheduling, Joint Committee on Community Development and Small Businesses, Joint Committee on Municipalities and Regional Government,  and the Joint Committee on Public Safety and Homeland Security.

Minicucci first ran for State Representative in 2018 upon the retirement of Diana DiZoglio. In the Democratic primary she defeated former Methuen city councilor Lisa Ferry, and in the general she beat Republican nominee Ryan Losco. In 2020, Minicucci won a second term with no opposition.

Minicucci is not seeking a third term in 2022, and will leave office in January 2023.

Personal life
Minicucci was born in Lawrence, Massachusetts to Louis Minicucci Jr. and Judy McCabe Minicucci. She married Eric Loth in 2002. She is a resident of North Andover and has three children named Fritz, Aidan, and Saoirse.

See also
 2019–2020 Massachusetts legislature
 2021–2022 Massachusetts legislature

References

Living people
21st-century American women politicians
21st-century American politicians
Women state legislators in Massachusetts
Democratic Party members of the Massachusetts House of Representatives
Bowdoin College alumni
People from North Andover, Massachusetts
Year of birth missing (living people)